Unxia gracilior is a species of beetle in the family Cerambycidae. It was described by Hermann Burmeister in 1865.

References

Unxiini
Beetles described in 1865
Taxa named by Hermann Burmeister